Ogan may refer to:

 Ogan (surname)
 Ogan Ilir Regency
 Ogan Komering Ilir Regency
 Ogan Komering Ulu Regency
 East Ogan Komering Ulu Regency
 South Ogan Komering Ulu Regency
 Ogan River, in South Sumatra, Indonesia
 Ogham, a Medieval alphabet used to write the early Irish language